TFRI may refer to:

 Taiwan Forestry Research Institute, a research institute in Taiwan
 Tropical Forest Research Institute, a research institute in India